Coluzea madagascarensis is a species of large sea snail, marine gastropod mollusk in the family Columbariidae.

Description
The length of the shell attains 77 mm.

Distribution
This marine species occurs off Madagascar.

References

 Harasewych M.G. 2004. New Columbariinae (Gastropoda: Turbinellidae) from the Indian Ocean. The Nautilus 118(3): 93-102 page(s): 95

Columbariidae
Gastropods described in 2004